Álbum is the second studio album by the Mexican pop duo Lu. The first single is called "La vida después de ti", the second single is called "Si tú me quisieras", and the third single is called "Voy a llorar".

Álbum
CD:
Enamorarme de Ti (To Fall in Love with You) 5:02
La Vida Después de Ti (Life After You) 4:44
Si Tú Me Quisieras (If you loved me) 5:07
Piénsalo bien (Think about it well) 3:59
Tú (You) 3:56
Te Voy  Extrañar (I will miss you) 4:49
Voy A Llorar (I'm going to cry) 4:01
Sin Un Adiós (Without a goodbye) 3:43
María 4:18
Maldita Estupidez (Damn stupidity) 4:55
Vida Hay Que Vivir (Life we have to live) 3:50

2004 albums
Lu (duo) albums